The Leader is a weekly newspaper first published in Angaston, South Australia on 24 July 1918, and continues to the present day to be published in the Barossa Valley. It was the first English-language newspaper covering any part of the Barossa Valley, apart from the Kapunda Herald.

History
The Leader was founded and for many years edited and printed by William Kirkby Robinson (1894–1976). Offices were from 1935 or earlier, to December 1938 or later, printed and published in Dean Street, Angaston.

From 1933 Robinson was  secretary of the Angaston branch of the Agricultural Bureau, and was the founder of the Lower North pruning competition held yearly. He was responsible for the formation of the Barossa Fire Fighting Association in 1926 and has been fire control officer since then, and was for many years chief officer of the Angaston Fire Brigade. He was an unsuccessful candidate for the seat of Barossa at the 1944 House of Assembly by-election. From 1937 he also published The Sport, an Adelaide weekly. He was for some time chairman of directors of the Provincial Press Co-operative Company Ltd. (an advertising agency linked to the Provincial Press Association of South Australia). He was married to Agnes Elizabeth Robinson  Knapp; they had one child, (Kirkby) Rae Robinson (1918–1990), who married Molly Mansfield (1918–2003) on 24 January 1942.

In 1964, The Leader absorbed the Murray Plains Recorder (13 January 1961 - 24 September 1964), formerly the Mannum and District Recorder (2 June 1955 – 16 June 1960), which had been published in Mannum.

Distribution
Its geographical coverage includes Angaston, Nuriootpa, Tanunda, Mount Pleasant, Kapunda and Gawler.

Digitisation
The National Library of Australia has digitised photographic copies of most issues of The Leader from Vol 1, No.1 of 24 July 1918 to Vol. 36 No. 1,961 of 16 December 1954 that may be accessed via Trove.

References

External links

Newspapers published in South Australia
Publications established in 1918
1918 establishments in Australia
Weekly newspapers published in Australia